B' (B + apostrophe) may represent:

 Bʼ (B + modifier apostrophe), symbol for palatalised b in Slavic notation
 B′ (B + prime), symbolising bottomness in particle physics
 Β′ or β′ (Beta prime)

It is not to be confused with:
 B́ (B + acute accent)
 Ḃ (B + overdot)
 Bʻ (B + ʻokina)
 Bꞌ  (B + saltillo)
 Bʾ (B + right half ring)
 Bʿ (B + left half ring)